The 2010–11 Nebraska Cornhuskers men's basketball team represented the University of Nebraska, Lincoln in the 2010–11 college basketball season. Head coach Doc Sadler was in his fifth season at Nebraska. The Cornhuskers competed in the Big 12 Conference and played their home games at the Bob Devaney Sports Center. They finished with a record of 19-13 overall, 7-9 in Big 12 Conference and lost in the first round of the 2011 Big 12 men's basketball tournament to Oklahoma State. They were invited to the 2011 National Invitation Tournament which they lost in the first round to Wichita State.

This was the Cornhuskers last season in the Big 12, as they moved to the Big Ten Conference in 2011–12.

Roster

2010–11 Schedule and results
 
|-
!colspan=9 style=| Bahamas Exhibition Tour

|-
!colspan=9 style=| Exhibition

|-
!colspan=9 style=| Regular Season

|-
!colspan=9 style=|Big 12 tournament

|-
!colspan=9 style=| NIT

References

Nebraska
Nebraska
Nebraska Cornhuskers men's basketball seasons
Corn
Corn